West End High School is a public high school in Walnut Grove, Alabama, United States. It is a part of Etowah County Schools.

History
West End High School was established in the summer of 1966 after the consolidation of Altoona High School and Walnut Grove High School.

Education 
According to state test scores, 37% of students are at least proficient in math and 37% in reading.

Athletics 
The following sports are offered at West End:

 Baseball
 Basketball
 Football
 Softball
 Volleyball

References

External links
 

Schools in Etowah County, Alabama
High schools in Alabama
Public high schools in Alabama
Educational institutions established in 1966
1966 establishments in Alabama